Macoupin County is located in the U.S. state of Illinois. According to the 2010 census, it had a population of 47,765. The county seat is Carlinville.

The primary industry is agriculture, consisting of crops of corn (maize), soybeans, and some wheat.

History

The region was inhabited by Illinoisan Indians when the first white explorers arrived. Indeed,  is an adaptation of the Miami-Illinois term for the American lotus, Nelumbo lutea. None of the native Indians remain, although some descendants of the earliest European settlers claim partial ancestry. The first European contact was by French explorers in the seventeenth century, travelling southward down the major rivers. The main European settlement was from the southwest, as people moved inland from the established transportation route of the Mississippi River.

Macoupin County was established on January 17, 1829. It was formed out of Greene and Madison Counties and was named after Macoupin Creek, which runs near Carlinville and meanders southwest to the Illinois River. The economy was based on subsistence agriculture, and communication was to the southwest.

In the middle 19th century, Illinois developed and changed rapidly. The greatest change was in the building of railroads, and Macoupin County was on the rail and road transportation link between St. Louis and the still-young metropolis of Chicago. The county lies midway between St. Louis and the relocated state capital of Springfield. The economy was still based entirely on agriculture, but there was now easier access to markets. Towns were small and sparsely distributed, and any new communities were founded along the railroad lines that provided transportation. Culturally, the county remained closer to its historical ties with St. Louis than to more northerly areas within the state.

Agriculture remained a mainstay of the economy, but this was joined by coal mining, an industry that partially changed the complexion of the county. With coal underlying the entire region, the most economical development was to place mines alongside the railroad tracks (for transportation of coal) and located in or near already-existing towns. By the twentieth century, there were mines in many towns, all of them with substantial populations of foreign-born miners from everywhere in Europe.

During the twentieth century, agriculture and coal mining remained the mainstays of the county's economy, and the county's fortunes rose and fell with them. Farming was still family based. Macoupin County was often at the center of major labor disputes between mine owners and miners, and was a hotbed of union activity. The county had previously played a major role in violent 1890s disputes that brought unwanted national attention, was at center stage when the United Mine Workers rose to power, and was again prominent during the internecine war between the UMW and the Progressive Miners of America of the 1930s.

Agriculture remained the county's prime economic activity, but farming became a large-scale corporate enterprise, with small family farms rapidly disappearing. Coal mining decreased and has almost disappeared entirely. Buildings and structures related to coal mining were torn down as they wasted away, so that there is now little to see of this once-major industry.

Towns were (and still are) characterized either by a midwestern town square layout, or by a main street layout. In the former, a central city block may be a small park with a gazebo, with the small businesses of the town surrounding it. In the latter, a single street will have the small businesses of the town lining either side of it. Carlinville has a city square layout, with the main county building occupying the central city block. This building houses all the offices of the county. Typically, churches of the various denominations will lie within two or three blocks of the town square, or sometimes will lie mainly along a single street near the town's center.

With modern roads easily accessible, some towns in the northern part of the county became virtual bedroom communities as people commuted to Springfield to work and shop, hastening the decline of small businesses in the towns. The same effect was felt in the southernmost part of the county, and in 2005, the U.S. Census Bureau included the county in the St. Louis Metropolitan Statistical Area due to increased commuting patterns and employment in St. Louis and the Metro-East.

Geography

Climate and weather

Major highways

  Interstate 55
  Illinois Route 4
  Illinois Route 16
  Illinois Route 138
  Illinois Route 108
  Illinois Route 111
  Illinois Route 159
  Illinois Route 267

Adjacent counties 
 Sangamon County - northeast
 Montgomery County - east
 Madison County - south
 Greene County - west
 Jersey County - west
 Morgan County - northwest

Demographics 

As of the 2010 United States Census, there were 47,765 people, 19,381 households, and 13,224 families residing in the county. The racial makeup of the county was 97.6% white, 0.8% black or African American, 0.3% Asian, 0.3% American Indian, 0.2% from other races, and 0.9% from two or more races. Those of Hispanic or Latino origin made up 0.9% of the population. In terms of ancestry, 35.8% were German, 16.2% were Irish, 13.9% were English, 9.5% were American, and 8.0% were Italian.

Of the 19,381 households, 30.2% had children under the age of 18 living with them, 53.5% were married couples living together, 9.8% had a female householder with no husband present, 31.8% were non-families, and 27.0% of all households were made up of individuals. The average household size was 2.42 and the average family size was 2.90. The median age was 41.7 years.

The median income for a household in the county was $47,178 and the median income for a family was $59,700. Males had a median income of $48,878 versus $30,748 for females. The per capita income for the county was $23,222. About 9.7% of families and 12.0% of the population were below the poverty line, including 17.4% of those under age 18 and 5.5% of those age 65 or over.

Communities

Cities

 Benld
 Bunker Hill
 Carlinville (seat)
 Gillespie
 Girard
 Mount Olive
 Staunton
 Virden

Towns
 Nilwood
 Shipman

Villages

 Brighton
 Chesterfield
 Dorchester
 Eagarville
 East Gillespie
 Hettick
 Lake Ka-ho
 Medora
 Modesto
 Mount Clare
 Palmyra
 Royal Lakes
 Sawyerville
 Scottville
 Standard City
 White City
 Wilsonville

Unincorporated communities

 Anderson
 Atwater
 Barr
 Hagaman
 Piasa
 Plainview
 Reader
 Womac
 Woodburn

Townships
Macoupin County is divided into twenty-six townships:

 Barr
 Bird
 Brighton
 Brushy Mound
 Bunker Hill
 Cahokia
 Carlinville
 Chesterfield
 Dorchester
 Gillespie
 Girard
 Hillyard
 Honey Point
 Mount Olive
 Nilwood
 North Otter
 North Palmyra
 Polk
 Scottville
 Shaws Point
 Shipman
 South Otter
 South Palmyra
 Staunton
 Virden
 Western Mound

Politics
As part of the rural German Catholic belt surrounding the Illinois section of the St. Louis metropolitan area, Macoupin County traditionally favored the Democratic Party. Up to and including the 2000 election, Macoupin voted for the Republican nominee only in six major landslide victories, and no Republican gained an absolute majority of the county's vote until Richard Nixon’s 3,000-plus-county landslides victory over George McGovern in 1972.

The twenty-first century has seen a major change in these voting patterns due to the county’s conservative population. The 2012 election saw Illinoisan Barack Obama become the first Democrat to win the presidency without carrying Macoupin County, and in 2016 Hillary Clinton won less than thirty percent of the vote in this once traditionally Democratic county – a figure eleven percent worse than McGovern’s in his landslide defeat.

See also
 National Register of Historic Places listings in Macoupin County, Illinois
 Charles Goodnight

References

External links
 Macoupin County web site
 Macoupin County fact sheet

 
Illinois counties
Illinois placenames of Native American origin
1829 establishments in Illinois
Populated places established in 1829